Before We Fall Asleep is the debut studio album by Nigerian singer-songwriter Johnny Drille. It was released on 3 September 2021, through Mavin Records. Self produced by Johnny Drille with additional productions from Wilson Muzik, London, Altims, and Fink. The album was exclusively produced by Don Jazzy, with A&R direction from Rima Tahini. The album features Don Jazzy, Styl-Plus, Ladipoe, Ayra Starr, Chylde, Lagos Community Choir, Cillsoul, Kwittee, with co-writers including Ayra brother credited as Milar, and Cill Soul.

Awards and nominations

References

2021 debut albums
Rhythm and blues albums by Nigerian artists
Soul albums by Nigerian artists
Afro pop music albums